Farradiyya (al-Farâdhiyyah) was a Palestinian Arab village of 670 located  southwest of Safad, A Jewish settlement called 'Farod' was built atop the once ruined village.

The Safad-Nazareth highway (Route 866) passed it to the north. Its total land area was 19,747 dunams, of which 25 dunams were built-up areas and 5,365 dunams cultivable.

In 1949, a kibbutz named Parod, after the village's ancient name, was founded nearby.

History

Classical antiquity 
The site has been suggested as that of the 2nd century CE Jewish community of Farod (alt. sp. Pārud), mentioned once in the Babylonian Talmud (Avodah Zarah 31a), and the place of residence of tannaic scholar, Bar Kappara. One Jewish tradition also places the burial site of Talmudic scholar Nachum Ish Gamzu on the main road as one approaches Farradiyya, where was once seen a large edifice made of hewn stones.

Middle ages 
Under the Abbasid Caliphate, al-Farradiyya was a part of Jund al-Urdunn ("Province of Jordan"). In 985 CE, Arab geographer al-Muqaddasi describes it as a large village between Acre and Tiberias, with a mosque for Friday sermons. He added that water was plentiful, the surrounding country was pleasant, and there were abundant grapes and vineyards in the village.

Ottoman era
Farradiyya was incorporated into the Ottoman Empire in 1517, after being ruled by Crusaders, Ayyubids, and the Mamluks. By the 1596 tax record, it was a part of the nahiya ("subdistrict") of Jira, part of the Safad Sanjak. The village consisted of 40 households and 3 bachelors, an estimated 237 persons; all Muslims. The villagers paid taxes on wheat, barley, olives, fruits, beehives, goats, and pastures; a total of 5,200 akçe.

A map from Napoleon's invasion of 1799 by Pierre Jacotin showed the place, named as "Farod". In 1875 Victor Guérin  noted the spring, Aïn Ferradheh, which had formerly driven several mills, but were now destroyed. He found the village to have about 150 Muslim inhabitants.

In 1881, the PEF's Survey of Western Palestine described the village as being built of stone and with the inhabitants growing olives, figs, and tilling small gardens. The population was still estimated to be about 150. Springs from Mount al-Jarmaq to the north provided most of the village's water supply, and a boys' elementary school was established during this period.

A population list from about 1887 showed that Farradiyya had about 455 Muslim inhabitants.

British Mandate era
After the British took over Palestine from the Ottomans in 1917, Farradiyya became a part of the British Mandate of Palestine in 1922. Under the Mandate, it had a thriving agriculture sector, and was known for its model experimental farm which covered 300 dunams of land. The farm was established to improve the variety of apples, apricots, almonds, figs, grapes, pears, and to develop new seed varieties. It had an arboretum where 2,000 plants were grown and distributed to local fellahin, and the farm provided advice services to teach farmers from the Acre and Safad districts how to raise poultry and beehives. Apart from the farm, there were several water-powered mills in the vicinity of Farradiyya. The village was also the site of a shrine for a local religious leader named Shaykh Mansur. A report from the village (before 1933) noted the Maqam (shrine) for Sheik Mansur as "a square building with arch and niche." The report also noted that there was a medieval arch in the cemetery.

In the 1922 census of Palestine, the village had 362 Muslim residents, rising to 465 in the 1931 census; 464 Muslims and 1 Christian, in a total of 101 houses.

The village was visited in 1933 by a representative from the Department of Antiquities, who reported that "A maqam known locally by the name of "Sheikh Manṣur" is standing in the main track leading to the village at a point about halfway between the village itself and the Govt. School for boys. It is a square room in a ruinous condition about 4m x 4m. The only part which is still to be seen in position is the northern wall -it consists of nine courses above the basement with an average of 27 cm height; each course; making a total of 2.45 m high. The N.E. corner as well as the middle of the wall have worn pilasters with 1/2 inch projections. The bases and capitals have simple mouldings. The top most course is made of moulded stones forming a cornice." The shrine of "Sheikh Manṣur" is thought to be that of Rabbi Tanḥum of Parod.

The British built here a fortified police station.

In the 1945 statistics the population was  670 Muslims, with a total of 19,747 dunams of land, according to an official land and population survey. Of this, 1,182 dunams were plantations and irrigable land, 4,137 for cereals; while a total of 25 dunams was built-up, or urban, area.

1948 War and aftermath
Farradiyya was captured by Israel's Golani Brigade in Operation Hiram on October 30, 1948. It was not directly assaulted, but as the brigade advanced north from the Arab town of Eilabun in the south towards Sa'sa' in the north, Farradiyya was surrounded by Israeli forces on all sides.

Prior to its capture, in early May, Arabs from Akbara and az-Zahiriyya took refuge in the village. Because it was not assaulted, many of Farradiyya's residents remained in the village until February 1949. It was on December 15, 1948, that Israeli authorities decided to expel the remaining 261 inhabitants, but the plan was executed in February. Israeli forces evicted most of the villagers to other Arab villages in the Galilee under their control or to the northern West Bank.

In 1992 the village site was described:The site is deserted and covered with wild thorns, trees, and piles of stones from the destroyed homes. Cactuses grow on the land around the site, which is mostly utilized for grazing animals.

Archaeological finds
Excavations conducted at the site in 1996 have revealed columbaria and burial caves (kokhim) dating back to the Early–Late Roman and Early Byzantine periods. Ceramics have also been found here from the Byzantine era. In 2010, a survey of the site was conducted by Cinamon Gilad and Baron Hendrik on behalf of the Israel Antiquities Authority (IAA).

See also
Depopulated Palestinian locations in Israel

Gallery

References

Bibliography

External links
Welcome to al-Farradiyya
al-Farradiyya, Zochrot
Survey of Western Palestine, Map 4:   IAA, Wikimedia commons 
al-Farradiyya, at Khalil Sakakini Cultural Center
Al-Farradiyya Dr. Khalil Rizk.
 "Memoirs"   "Refugee Interviews" in Journal of Palestine Studies: 
 "Refugee Interviews" special feature in 18, no. 1 (Aut. 88): 158-71. Featuring testimonies of witnesses of the fall of Farradiyyah, Acre,`Ayn Ghazal, and Umm al-Fahm.  pdf-file, downloadable

Arab villages depopulated after the 1948 Arab–Israeli War
District of Safad
Talmud places